Vexillum crocatum, common name : the saffron mitre, is a species of small sea snail, marine gastropod mollusk in the family Costellariidae, the ribbed miters.

Description
The shell size varies between 17 mm and 36 mm

Distribution
This species is distributed in the Red Sea, in the Indian Ocean along Chagos and the Mascarene Basin, and in the Indo-West Pacific.

References

 Sheppard, A (1984). The molluscan fauna of Chagos (Indian Ocean) and an analysis of its broad distribution patterns. Coral Reefs 3: 43–50
 Drivas, J. & M. Jay (1988). Coquillages de La Réunion et de l'île Maurice
 Turner H. 2001. Katalog der Familie Costellariidae Macdonald, 1860. Conchbooks. 1-100 page(s): 27

External links
 
  Liénard, Élizé. Catalogue de la faune malacologique de l'île Maurice et de ses dépendances comprenant les îles Seychelles, le groupe de Chagos composé de Diego-Garcia, Six-îles, Pèros-Banhos, Salomon, etc., l'île Rodrigues, l'île de Cargados ou Saint-Brandon. J. Tremblay, 1877.
 W.O.Cernohorsky, The Mitridae of Fiji - The Veliger v. 8 (1965-1966)

crocatum
Gastropods described in 1811